Alinia is a genus of square-headed wasps in the family Crabronidae. There are at least four described species in Alinia.

Species
These four species belong to the genus Alinia:
 Alinia alinae Leclercq, 1993 i c g
 Alinia altivaga Leclercq, 1993 i c g
 Alinia carinata Antropov, 1993 i c g
 Alinia mogina Leclercq, 2005 i c g
Data sources: i = ITIS, c = Catalogue of Life, g = GBIF, b = Bugguide.net

References

Further reading

 
 

Crabronidae